WEAA (88.9 FM) is a non-profit, National Public Radio affiliate station that serves Baltimore, Maryland. It is licensed and owned by Morgan State University.  WEAA is located on campus, with studios at the School of Global Journalism and Communication, and a transmitter on Hillen Road.

WEAA was named 1999 Jazz Station of the Year by Gavin Magazine.

The station has been noted for its willingness to host intense discussions of issues like racism and sexuality.

Although WEAA is based at Morgan State, most of its staff are non-students, and it serves a larger community within Baltimore. However, the station does take on many student interns and volunteers, who learn skills connected to radio broadcasting.

History
WEAA went live on January 10, 1977. It debuted at 88.9 MHz as an educational, non-commercial station. Its first format was "black progressive," which featured a wide range of music by black performers: jazz, Caribbean, a gospel show, some blues, some soul, and album tracks by black artists. The station also had a news department and broadcast some educational programs. Some sources have claimed that the call letters stood for "We Educate African-Americans."  Program manager Al Stewart said his vision was for the station to both educational and entertaining. And because the station was on the campus of Morgan State, students would be given valuable experience gathering news or producing public affairs programs, in addition to serving as deejays.  After beginning with 18 hours a day of programming, WEAA tried to move to a 24-hour a day operation in mid-May 1977. However, the station was not able to sustain this, and instead returned to a regular schedule of being on air from 6 AM to midnight, 7 days a week.

Within a few months, WEAA was gaining positive attention for its news coverage:  student reporters focused on events of interest to the black community, in addition to events occurring on campus. Members of the news department also began winning awards for their news features.  The station also covered college sports, including Morgan State football.  WEAA soon proved to be successful at fundraising, getting listeners to support the station's programs. By 1979, the station was able to raise more than $50,000 during a pledge drive, exceeding the station management's expectations. Additionally, WEAA became home to several people who went on to become famous. Among them was Kweisi Mfume, who served as program director of WEAA, beginning in the late 1970s, and also hosted a popular talk show; Mfume subsequently went on to a career in politics. Another famous alum of WEAA was April Ryan, who began working there as a disc jockey and then began hosting a news program in the late 1980s; she went on to become a news reporter for the American Urban Radio Networks, and a political analyst for CNN. Some professional announcers also worked at WEAA, mentoring young students interested in broadcasting: one well-known veteran of black radio in Baltimore, Larry Dean (real name: Lawrence D. Faulkner), helped to start WEAA's news department and worked as the station's news director for nearly eight years.

Station Controversies

In 1998, white Baltimore activist Robert Kaufman accused WEAA of reverse racism when they turned down his offer to host a show for free. Kaufman's complaint with the Maryland Commission on Human Rights was unsuccessful.

In 2007, a coalition of WEAA listeners took to the streets in protest when "The Powers Report" with Tyrone Powers went off the air. Powers and his supporters alleged that newly elected governor Martin O'Malley had used his political clout to force Powers off the air in retaliation for critical remarks. Powers filed a lawsuit alleging that O'Malley ordered him fired, with WEAA manager Donald Lockett and NAACP president Kweisi Mfume acting as intermediaries. O'Malley and Mfume denied the allegations completely.

In 2008, WEAA hired Marc Steiner (after Steiner's dismissal from WYPR) and began running Democracy Now!. These changes increased the ratio of news to music and added white voices, prompting observers to ask, "Will whites listen to a majority black station?" In the following months, WEAA gained 20,000 listeners for a total of 100,000.

Current programs

Programs produced in-house at WEAA

Public Affairs programming 
 Today with Dr. Kaye hosted by Dr. Kaye Wise Whitehead 
 The Marc Steiner Show hosted by Marc Steiner and produced by the Center for Emerging Media
 First Edition with journalist Sean Yoes
 Keep It Moving with Marsha Jews
 Wealthy Radio with Deborah Owens
 Urban Health Beat with Marilyn Harris-Davis
 The Anthony McCarthy Show with Anthony McCarthy
 Listen Up! and Final Call Radio with Farajii Muhammad
 The Caribbean Affair with Neil Mattei
 Africa and Worldbeat
 Briefcase Radio with Omar Muhammad
 The Ellison Report with political analyst Charles D. Ellison
 The Rise of Charm City

Music programming 
 The Baltimore Blend hosted by Baltimore drummer and musician Robert Shahid and co-hosted by Mykel Hunter
 The Hip Hop Chronicles hosted and produced by Mike Nyce with contributions from Dr. Jared Ball and the Chuck D
 In the Groove and Cool Jazz Countdown with Marcellus Bassman Shepard
 The Audio Infusion with DJ Patrick Scientific and DJ Henry Da Man
 Reggae, Roots & Culture with Papa Wabe
 Cool Vibes For Your Midday with Sandi Mallory
 Fiesta Musical with Guillermo Brown
 In the Tradition with George Doc Manning
 Jazz Straight Ahead produced and hosted by John Tegler and currently hosted by his two sons Eric Tegler and Jan Tegler
 Blues in the Night and Turning Back the Hands of Time with host James Big Jim Staton
 The Friday Night Jazz Club with Angela Thorpe and DJ Phaze
 Strictly Hip Hop Baltimore's longest running underground hip-hop show which originated in 1990.
 Gospel Grace

Syndicated programs on WEAA 
 Democracy NOW! with Amy Goodman and Juan Gonzales
 Jazz After Hours with Bob Parlocha
 Latino USA hosted by Maria Hinojosa

Past programs
 The Michael Eric Dyson Show (2010–2012)
 The Powers Report with Tyrone Powers (–2007)
 Underground Experience with Oji Morris and Brian Pope (1989–2002)
 Sisters Circle with Nalonga Sayyed and Faraja Lewis
 Dialogue with the African-American Male with Richard Rowe and Earl El-Amin

See also
 List of jazz radio stations in the United States
 List of community radio stations in the United States

References

External links
WEAA Website
 Video interview with The Bassman

1977 establishments in Maryland
African-American history in Baltimore
EAA
Jazz radio stations in the United States
Morgan State University
NPR member stations
Public Radio International stations
Radio stations established in 1977
EAA